Marquess of Castelldosrius is a hereditary title in the Peerage of Spain, accompanied by the dignity Grandee and granted on 6 April 1696 by Charles II to Manuel de Oms y Santa Pau, knight of the Order of Malta, governor of Tarragona, viceroy and captain general of Mallorca, of Peru, of Tierra Firme and of Chile. The grandeeship was merged into the marquessate on 9 July 1701 by Philip V, later confirmed on 1 May 1703.

The title is currently held by Ágatha Ruiz de la Prada y Sentmenat, who also holds the title of Baroness of Santa Pau.

Marquesses of Castelldosrius 
Other titles (all): Grandee of Spain
 Manuel de Oms y de Santa Pau, 1st Marquess of Castelldosrius (died 1710)
 Félix de Sentmenat-Oms y de Santa Pau, 2nd Marquess of Castelldosrius (son of the 1st Marquess)
 Juan Manuel de Sentmenat-Oms y de Santa Pau, 3rd Marquess of Castelldosrius (son of the 1st Marquess)
 Manuel de Sentmenat-Oms y de Santa Pau, 4th Marquess of Castelldosrius (son of the 3rd Marquess)
 Francisco Javier de Sentmenat-Oms y de Santa Pau, 5th Marquess of Castelldosrius (son of the 4th Marquess)
 Pedro Carlos de Sentmenat-Oms y de Santa, 6th Marquess of Castelldosrius (grandson of the 4th Marquess)
 Carlos de Sentmenat-Oms y de Santa Pau, 7th Marquess of Castelldosrius (grandson of the 4th Marquess)
 Ramón de Sentmenat y Sáenz-Ramírez, 8th Marquess of Castelldosrius (son of the 7th Marquess)
Other titles (9th–12th Marquess): Marquess of Oris and Baron of Santa Pau
 Carlos de Sentmenat y Sentmenat, 9th Marquess of Castelldosrius (son of the 8th Marquess)
 Félix de Sentmenat y Güell, 10th Marquess of Castelldosrius (son of the 9th Marquess)
 Carlos de Sentmenat y Urruela, 11th Marquess of Castelldosrius (son of the 10th Marquess, died without issue)
 Santiago de Sentmenat y Urruela, 12th Marquess of Castelldosrius (son of the 10th Marquess)
Other titles (13th Marchioness onwards): Baroness of Santa Pau
 Ágatha Ruiz de la Prada y Sentmenat, 13th Marchioness of Castelldosrius (born 1960) (granddaughter of the 9th Marquess)

The heir apparent is Tristán Jerónimo Ramírez Ruiz de la Prada (eldest son of the 13th Marchioness).

Succession 

After the death of the 11th Marquess, Carlos de Sentmenat y Urruela, in 2005, the marquessate passed unto his brother, Santiago de Sentmenat y Urruela, who was also the 4th Marquess of Oris. However, Ágatha Ruiz de la Prada, niece of the 11th Marquess, sued his uncle, the 12th Marquess, for the Marquessate of Castelldosrius and the Barony of Santa Pau, both of which had claim by him, on the grounds that she was the rightful heir to the said titles, as her mother was older than Santiago, and thus, in accordance with a law passed in 2005, she was next in line to both titles. After almost 4 years of legal battles, Ruiz de la Prada, through judicial sentence, was granted both titles.

References 

1703 in Spain
1701 in Spain
Grandees of Spain
1696 in Spain
Marquessates in the Spanish nobility
Spanish noble titles